Cha ca La Vong (Chả cá Lã Vọng in Vietnamese) is a Vietnamese grilled fish dish, originally from Hanoi. The dish is traditionally made with hemibagrus (or ca lang in Vietnamese), which is a genus of catfish. The fish is cut into pieces and marinated in a turmeric-based sauce, which often includes shrimp paste or fish sauce, ginger, and chili peppers. Sometimes, saffron is used instead of turmeric. It is then lightly grilled over charcoal. The dish is served in a hot pan coated with marinade sauce and herbs, particularly dill. Other herbs, such as scallions or basil, may be included. It is eaten with vermicelli rice noodles (bún in Vietnamese) and peanuts. Cha Ca La Vong is considered a delicacy in Vietnam, as it is nearly exclusively served in restaurants and is not found in street food.

History 
In the 19th century, the Doan family were known to prepare grilled fish for their neighbors. The dish became so popular that their local community helped the family open a restaurant, named Cha Ca La Vong, in 1871. The words "Cha ca" translate to "fish sausage" in Vietnamese. Meanwhile, "La Vong" was inspired by a local statue of Jiang Ziya, also known as Lu Wang (pronounced as La Vong in Vietnamese), the fisherman-turned-politician who symbolized the potential for patient, talented people.

The restaurant opened at 14 Hang Son Street, between Hang Ma and Lan Ong streets, in the Old Quarter of Hanoi. This was reportedly the same street where the Doan family had lived before opening the restaurant. It was managed by Doan Phuc and his wife Bi Van. In its early days, the restaurant was a meeting place and hideout for anti-colonial rebels. However, the restaurant later became popular with aristocrats and colonial troops of French Indochina. Copycat restaurants opened on the street with similar names, such as Cha Ca La Song. Other restaurants used the exact same name. For this reason, Hang Son was officially renamed Cha Ca. 

The original Cha Ca La Vong restaurant is still open in Hanoi, where it only serves its signature dish, and guests eat from charcoal burners at communal tables. The restaurant was listed as a destination in the book 1000 Places to Visit Before You Die.

Contemporary interpretations 
The dish has left a strong impression on food critics and bloggers. As explained by Florence Fabricant, "The combination of ingredients — turmeric, dill, shrimp paste and fish sauce — delivers an intriguing muskiness bolstered with chiles, silky noodles and a thicket of other fresh herbs to season the chunks of moist fish. My memories are still vivid after 10 years."

Some chefs have developed their own interpretation of the dish, particularly in places where hemibragus may be less common. In the United States, some restaurants serve the dish with a variety of fish types and cooking styles, including: grilled catfish satay, grilled basa, grilled tilapia, whole broiled flounder, and halibut salad.

References 

 

Vietnamese cuisine
Fish dishes
Vietnamese seafood dishes